Martyrius is the name of:
 Martyrius of Antioch, Patriarch of Antioch from 460 to 470
 Martyrius, Archbishop of Esztergom (r. 1151–1158)
 Martyrius of Jerusalem, Patriarch of Jerusalem from 478 to 486
 Sisinnius, Martyrius and Alexander, martyrs
 Sahdona, 7th century Syrian theologian also known as Martyrius
 Saint Martiros, 4th-century Syrian martyr venerated in Armenia